Thomas Vachell may refer to:

Thomas Vachell (died 1553) (fl. c. 1543), English member of parliament for Reading (UK Parliament constituency)
Thomas Vachell (1537–1610),  English member of parliament for Reading (UK Parliament constituency)